Prince Hubertus Karl Wilhelm of Prussia (30 September 1909 – 8 April 1950) was the third son of Crown Prince Wilhelm of Germany and Duchess Cecilie of Mecklenburg-Schwerin, and member of the princely House of Hohenzollern.

Biography

He joined the army in 1934 (infantry regiment 8 in Frankfurt/Oder) and participated in the Invasion of Poland in 1939. One year later he was dismissed from the army by Hitler's Prinzenerlaß, following the death of his elder brother Prince Wilhelm of Prussia, who was wounded in France in May 1940 and later died in a Field hospital in Belgium.

Marriage and issue
On 29 December 1941, he married Baroness Maria Anna Sybilla Margaretha von Humboldt-Dachröden (9 July 1916 – 24 September 2003) in Oels, Schlesien. They divorced a little over a year later in early 1943 (the same year she would later give birth to Hubertus' cousin, Ernest Augustus', illegitimate son), and on 5 June of that year, he married again to Princess Magdalena Reuss of Köstritz (20 August 1920 – 10 October 2009). They had two daughters:

Princess Anastasia Victoria Cecilia Hermine of Prussia (born 14 February 1944); married Alois-Konstantin, 9th Prince of Löwenstein-Wertheim-Rosenberg and had issue.
Princess Marie Christine of Prussia (18 July 1947 – 29 May 1966); died from injuries resulting from a car accident.

Prince Hubertus died of appendicitis on 8 April 1950 at Windhoek, South West Africa. He was buried in Hohenzollern Castle.

Ancestry

References

1909 births
1950 deaths
German Army personnel of World War II
House of Hohenzollern
People from Potsdam
People from the Province of Brandenburg
Prussian princes
Deaths from appendicitis